Dechu is a village in Jodhpur district of the Indian state of Rajasthan.

Nearby places
Junakheda (1.5 km), Bhojakor (11 km), Gilakor (12 km), Peelwa (16 km), Chordiya (16 km), Kushlawa (17 km) and Thadiya, Rajasthan (8 km).

Amenities

Dechu has many tourist resorts and hotels, such as the Samsara Dechu Desert Resort for camping, Manwar, many hotel are there.

Sand dunes, temples, and old Wells are the main tourist attractions in Dechu. Also, there is a way (road) to reach at the top of Sand dunes. 

The Pokaran fort, Baba Ramdev Temple and Salim Singh Haveli are frequent tourist destinations.

References

Villages in Jodhpur district